Willow Hill is a village in Jasper County, Illinois. The population was 230 at the 2010 census.

Geography
Willow Hill is located in eastern Jasper County.

Hickory Creek, a tributary of the North Fork of the Embarras River, flows across the northeast portion of the village.

Demographics

As of the census of 2000, there were 250 people, 82 households, and 65 families residing in the village. The racial makeup of the village was 96.40% White, 3.20% Asian, and 0.40% from two or more races.

There were 82 households, out of which 42.7% had children under the age of 18 living with them, 70.7% were married couples living together, 3.7% had a female householder with no husband present, and 20.7% were non-families. 17.1% of all households were made up of individuals, and 8.5% had someone living alone who was 65 years of age or older. The average household size was 3.05 and the average family size was 3.48.

In the village, the population was spread out, with 36.0% under the age of 18, 6.4% from 18 to 24, 27.6% from 25 to 44, 18.8% from 45 to 64, and 11.2% who were 65 years of age or older. The median age was 29 years. For every 100 females, there were 104.9 males. For every 100 females age 18 and over, there were 107.8 males.

The median income for a household in the village was $26,429, and the median income for a family was $30,625. Males had a median income of $27,679 versus $17,188 for females. The per capita income for the village was $10,926. About 17.1% of families and 24.0% of the population were below the poverty line, including 38.6% of those under the age of eighteen and 14.3% of those 65 or over.

Notable people 

 George W. Fithian, attorney and politician

References

Villages in Jasper County, Illinois
Villages in Illinois